John Kevin Plumridge (born 13 April 1944 – 28 June 2016) was an Australian rules footballer who played with South Melbourne in the Victorian Football League (VFL).

Notes

External links 

2016 deaths
1944 births
Australian rules footballers from Victoria (Australia)
Sydney Swans players